David Richard Bull (born 9 May 1969) is an English television presenter, author and politician who has served as Deputy Leader of Reform UK since 2021. He was a Member of the European Parliament (MEP) for North West England from 2019 to 2020.

Bull studied at St Mary's Hospital Medical School at Imperial College London and worked as a pre-registration and then senior house officer at St Mary's Hospital, Ealing Hospital and Whittington Hospital. He began a career in broadcasting in 1995 and appeared on The Jeremy Vine Show, Watchdog, The Alan Titchmarsh Show, Newsround, Most Haunted Live!, Richard & Judy, Tomorrow's World, This Morning and The Wright Stuff. As well as appearing on British television, he has presented Sugar Dome and appeared on The Rachael Ray Show in the US.

In 2006, Bull was nominated as the Conservative candidate for Brighton Pavilion in the following general election. He stood down in 2009 to head up a Conservative policy review on sexual health and was replaced by Charlotte Vere. He joined the Brexit Party, later Reform UK, in 2019 and was elected as one of their MEPs for North West England at that year's European Parliament election. He stood down upon the United Kingdom's withdrawal from the EU in January 2020. He became Deputy Leader of Reform UK in March 2021.

Early life
David Bull was born in Farnborough, Kent, to Richard and Pauline Bull, and moved to Framlingham, Suffolk, at the age of four with his siblings Anthony and Katie. He attended Fairfield Preparatory School, Ipswich Preparatory School and Framlingham College. He studied at St Mary's Hospital Medical School at Imperial College London, graduating with a Bachelor of Medicine degree, a Bachelor of Surgery degree (MBBS) and a Bachelor of Science honours degree (BSc) in 1993.

Medical career
Bull was a pre-registration house officer at St Mary's Hospital in Paddington and worked for the NHS in the fields of emergency medicine at Ealing Hospital NHS Trust, and general medicine and emergency medicine at Whittington Hospital in London. He continued to work as a junior doctor in general medicine, surgery and accident and emergency.

Bull had his licence to practise restored in March 2020 in response to the COVID-19 pandemic in the United Kingdom (his license to practice had previously ceased in 2009 and 2017).

Media career
In 1995, Bull auditioned to be a guest commentator for The Sky Travel Guide on Sky Travel. Of the auditioning process Bull recalled, "I had to read autocue, I had to interview someone, and I had to handle a live show...you can't beat that sort of experience." Bull was awarded the position on Sky Travel, giving advice for the holiday health feature to those travelling abroad, and beginning his career as a television commentator and presenter.

Bull joined the long-running Newsround as a presenter and producer of segments regarding children's health. Whilst on Newsround, Bull became a regular on popular kids shows on Saturday mornings for CBBC, The Weather Show, Saturday Aardvark, K Club and Bitesize Debate specials. He also hosted, in his role as a doctor, Why Me? and Call the Doctor. Bull then became the sole presenter of Tell Me About It! for New Zealand's C4 TV station. Aimed at young people, the five-instalment programme tackled issues including eating disorders, parental divorces and teen drug use and alcoholism.

In 1998, Bull published his first book, Cool and Celibate?: Sex and No Sex, arguing the benefits of abstinence in teenagers. Bull followed this with What Every Girl Should Know: An A to Z of Health-From Allergies to Zits! in 1999.

Bull joined the BBC's Watchdog in 1999. While on Watchdog, he also appeared on Holiday, Let's Get Healthy, The Really Useful Show, Daily Live and This Morning. He then hosted Watchdog Healthcheck, a weekly, half-hour health programme running from 2001 to 2002.

He also presented the science and technology-centred Tomorrow's World, before presenting Most Haunted on Living TV. Bull appeared on Live TV's highest rated series, Most Haunted Live! from October 2002 to October 2005, hosting three-hour instalments that featured paranormal investigations broadcast live with interactive sections involving the audience. Bull also participated in a ghost hunt at Choughs Hotel where he claimed to have seen an apparition, though he admitted it could have been an optical illusion.

Bull made his American television debut in 2010 as a contributor on the daytime talk show The Rachael Ray Show. In 2012, Bull started hosting for Food Network's series Sugar Dome which is broadcast in the US, Canada, Asia and the UK. He has also co-presented Coast vs Country on Channel 4.

In 2013, Bull appeared in the romantic comedy film Cavemen.

Political career
In December 2006, Bull was selected to represent the Parliamentary seat of Brighton Pavilion at the 2010 general election for the Conservative Party, after being placed on the party's A-List earlier that year. He withdrew his candidacy in June 2009 and was replaced by Charlotte Vere. Denying rumours that he quit after falling out with party leadership, Bull cited the increased workload accompanying his recent appointment to head up a Conservative policy review on sexual health with Shadow Health Minister Anne Milton.

In April 2019, Bull was announced as a Brexit Party candidate in the 2019 European Parliament election. He was duly returned as an MEP for the North West England constituency in the election held on 23 May. Later, in August of that year, Bull was adopted as the Brexit Party's prospective parliamentary candidate (PPC) for Central Suffolk and North Ipswich then subsequently Sedgefield in the 2019 general election.

Bull was among the UK MEPs who stood down following the UK's withdrawal from the European Union on 31 January 2020.

On 11 March 2021, Bull was made deputy leader of Reform UK, the successor to the Brexit Party.

In March 2021, Bull was announced as the Reform UK candidate for the City and East constituency in the 2021 London Assembly election. He came fifth.

Business and charitable work
In 2000, Bull founded a creative branding company, Incredibull. He sold his interest in the business in 2017.

Bull is a supporter of The Cystic Fibrosis Trust, The British Red Cross, Cancer Research and The Duke of Edinburgh's Award and has worked with young people in schools on behalf of the organisation.

Personal life
Bull is openly gay. In 2007 he appeared at the Brighton Pride Parade for which he designed and wore a t-shirt with the slogan "I've come out... I'm a Tory", saying it was acceptable to be gay and a Conservative.

Electoral history

2019 general election

2019 European elections

References

External links 
 davidbull.com

1969 births
20th-century English medical doctors
21st-century English LGBT people
Alumni of Imperial College London
Brexit Party MEPs
Reform UK parliamentary candidates
British television personalities
Conservative Party (UK) politicians
Gay politicians
English businesspeople
English male non-fiction writers
English non-fiction writers
English political commentators
English political journalists
English television journalists
Living people
British LGBT broadcasters
LGBT conservatism
LGBT MEPs for the United Kingdom
English LGBT politicians
English LGBT writers
Medical journalists
MEPs for England 2019–2020
People educated at Ipswich School
People educated at Framlingham College
People from Framlingham
Medical doctors from Suffolk
Politicians from Brighton and Hove